The 570s decade ran from January 1, 570, to December 31, 579.

Significant people

References

Bibliography